Sandar Church (Norwegian: Sandar kirke) is the oldest church in Sandefjord, Norway in Vestfold og Telemark. The church was erected at the ruins of a mediaeval stone church from the 13th century. The current church was built in 1792 in the style of Louis XV of France. Sandar Church originally had a half-circle dome top, but the roofing was changed to the current spire in 1868.

Sandar Church was first mentioned in a written document in 1345. This Medieval church was later replaced with the current church, which was built between 1790 and 1792. The new church was inaugurated by bishop Christen Schmidt and was named Friedrich Church in honor of King Frederick VI. Outside is a sculpture depicting priest and poet Magnus Brostrup Landstad. The Landstad sculpture is Norway's first statue made of hard rock. It was unveiled on May 17, 1928, and was made by sculptor Hans Holmen.

It was the main church of Sandeherred municipality, later known as Sandar. After the merge of 1968, Sandar Church became recognized as a Sandefjord city church. It is located in the city centre, just 300 meters from Sandefjord Church. The church was dedicated on August 15, 1792.

It is only open in connection with advertised church events. It has seating capacity for 800 persons.

History
The original stone church was described by the Latin name "Sancte Marie et sancti Olaui" in Bishop Eystein Aslakssøn's book from 1398.

A stone church of the Middle Ages was located at the present location of Sandar Church. During excavations here, several coins from the year 1200 were recovered. Sandar Church was consecrated on August 15, 1792. Count Christian Ahlefeldt-Laurvig initiated the building.

The church underwent restoration for NOK 13.4 million from November 2020 to July 2021. The restoration was funded by the municipality, the Norwegian Directorate for Cultural Heritage, and donations from private companies, individuals, and nonprofits.

Medieval church
The current church is located at the site where a former Medieval church was located, the Sancte Marie Et Sancti Olaui church. It is not known when the stone church was first erected, however, it has been estimated to have been first built in the 1100s. It was demolished in the spring of 1790 to be replaced by the current church. The church was dedicated to Saint Mary and Saint Olaf, according to Eystein's 1398 book, and it was dedicated on Saint Faith Day October 6. It does not mention what year the dedication took place. Although it is most likely dedicated to the mother of Jesus, S. A. Sørensen claims in “Lidt om Sandeherred før i Tiden” (1872) that the church was dedicated to Saint Mary Magdalene. The 1901-1902 excavations revealed the church to have been a Roman Catholic stone church with apses and a tower. The church's rectangular nave was 19.2 x 12 meters, the choir 6.3 x 8 meters, and its tower 8.4 meters in length and 11.6 meters broad. The total length of the church was estimated to have been 37.6 meters. The stone tower was removed in 1401 but was later replaced several times. A wooden tower was installed in 1603 after the stone tower was removed for good.

Gallery

References

18th-century Church of Norway church buildings
Buildings and structures in Sandefjord
Churches completed in 1792
Churches in Vestfold og Telemark